Adventures for 12-String, 6-String and Banjo is an album by American folk guitarist Dick Rosmini, released in 1964. It is out of print in LP format, appears never to have been released in CD format, and has been available as an MP3 download since October 5, 2010 (ASIN B004620SNC).

History
Rosmini is best known for his role in the American "folk revival" of the 1960s as a session player and accompanist. Adventures for 12-String, 6-String and Banjo was Rosmini's first solo album and was, at the time, one of the few solo steel-string guitar albums available. He recorded only four albums under his own name, two of them instructional albums.

Adventures for 12-String, 6-String and Banjo has been cited as a major influence by many acoustic guitarists including Dave Van Ronk and Leo Kottke. It is mainly solo guitar or banjo plus bass, second guitars, and percussion.

Reception

Writing for Allmusic, music critic Richard Meyer wrote of the album "This album predates much of John Fahey's work and certainly that of Leo Kottke and the other "American primitive" guitarists. Hard to find but well worth the search"

Track listing

Side one
"Little Brown Dog"
"900 Miles to Go"
"Casey"
"Joshua"
"Shady Grove" (Traditional)
"Improvisation for 12-String" (Rosmini)
"St. James Drag"
"Macedonian Rag"

Side two

"John Hardy" (Traditional)
"Two Shady Ladies in 3/4 Time" (Traditional)
"Jelly Roll"
"Picker's Medley"
"Goin' Baroque"
"Sweet Substitute"
"Freight Train" (Elizabeth Cotten)
"Sadie"
"Minstrel Boy"

Personnel
Dick Rosmini – 6 and 12-string guitar, banjo (double-tracked on "John Hardy" (banjo) and "Minstrel Boy", "Sweet Substitute" and "Jelly Roll" (guitar), whistling, arranger, adapter
Red Mitchell – bass
Gene Estes – drums
Doug Marsch – drums
Allan Reuss – second guitar
Tony Rizzi – second guitar
Johnny Horton – second guitar
Technical
Mark Abramson - recording
William S. Harvey - design
Angelo Laiacona - photography

References

External links
Illustrated Dick Rosmini discography

1964 debut albums
Elektra Records albums
Dick Rosmini albums
Albums arranged by Dick Rosmini
albums produced by Jac Holzman